Gurianna Korinihona (born 4 November 1984) is a former Solomon Islands female tennis player.

Playing for Pacific Oceania in Fed Cup, Korinihona has a W/L record of 11–8.

Korinihona retirement from professional tennis 2010.

Fed Cup participation

Singles

Doubles

Other finals

Doubles

ITF junior results

Singles (0/1)

Doubles (2/0)

References

External links 
 
 

1984 births
Living people
People from Honiara
Solomon Islands female tennis players